Igenche (İgense) is a rural locality (a village) in Chekmagushevsky District, Bashkortostan, Russia. The population was 110 as of 2010. There are 2 streets.

Geography 
Igenche is located 5 km northwest of Chekmagush (the district's administrative centre) by road. Chekmagush is the nearest rural locality.

References 

Rural localities in Chekmagushevsky District